Željova is a village in the municipality of Banovići, Bosnia and Herzegovina.

History 
Up until the Bosnian War almost only Serbs lived in Željova, who were attacked by the Ustašas in World War II, and the village was literally overturned in the Bosnian War.

Demographics 
According to the 2013 census, its population was 19.

References

Populated places in Banovići